The Uniab River is an ephemeral river on Namibia Skeleton Coast, located between Torra Bay and Terrace Bay. Its mouth is in the Grootberg Mountains near Palmwag. Inflows of the Uniab are Kaikams, Kawakab, Aub, Urenindes and Obob. The river once created a large river delta with five main watercourses. Today it continues to flow only in one of the watercourses, but subterranean water surfaces as springs in the other channels.

These springs are lifeline to the springbok and oryx roaming this desolate stretch of coast and also attract a variety of birds. The river trickles over a waterfall into a narrow gorge through bright reddish-pink sandstone and yellow calcrete formations. The Uniab is a temporary river and is best known possibly as desert-adopted elephant country. There is a large animal presence in and around the river including zebra, lion, leopard, black rhino and giraffe.

The river is a tourist attraction owing to its scenic vistas, such as the air view from the Skeleton Coast of Namibia, and the wildlife. The Palmwag Lodge sits on the dry banks of the river and is one of Namibia's oldest tourist destinations.

References

External links
 Namibia Travel Guide
 Skeleton Coast
 Palmwag Lodge

Rivers of Namibia
Geography of Kunene Region